Alexander James may refer to:
 Alexander James (wrestler), American professional wrestler
 Alex James (footballer), Scottish footballer
 Alex James (songwriter), British songwriter and record producer

See also
 Alex James (disambiguation)